GTP-binding protein 1 is a protein that in humans is encoded by the GTPBP1 gene.

This gene is upregulated by interferon-gamma and encodes a protein that is a member of the AGP11/GTPBP1 family of GTP-binding proteins. A structurally similar protein has been found in mice, where disruption of the gene for that protein had no observable phenotype.

References

Further reading